Darrell Goodwin (born 2 September 1965) is a Zimbabwean cricketer. He played two first-class matches for Mashonaland in 1994/95.

In February 2020, he was named in Zimbabwe's squad for the Over-50s Cricket World Cup in South Africa. However, the tournament was cancelled during the third round of matches due to the COVID-19 pandemic.

See also
 List of Mashonaland first-class cricketers

References

External links
 

1965 births
Living people
Zimbabwean cricketers
Mashonaland cricketers
Sportspeople from Bulawayo